Sergii Shevtsov (born 29 June 1998) is a Ukrainian swimmer. He competed in the men's 50 metre freestyle event at the 2018 FINA World Swimming Championships (25 m), in Hangzhou, China.

References

External links

1998 births
Living people
Ukrainian male swimmers
Ukrainian male freestyle swimmers
Swimmers at the 2015 European Games
European Games competitors for Ukraine
Swimmers at the 2020 Summer Olympics
Olympic swimmers of Ukraine
Competitors at the 2017 Summer Universiade
Sportspeople from Zaporizhzhia
20th-century Ukrainian people
21st-century Ukrainian people